Cannonsfield is a townland in Athlone, County Westmeath, Ireland. The townland is in the civil parish of St. Mary's.

The small townland stands to the east of the city centre. The Marist College occupies most of the land, with the Dublin–Westport/Galway railway line running through the south.

References 

Townlands of County Westmeath